The 2010 Korean FA Cup Final was a football match played on 24 October 2010 at Busan Asiad Stadium in Busan that decided the winner of the 2010 season of the Korean FA Cup. The 2010 final was the culmination of the 15th season of the tournament.

The final was contested by Busan I'Park and Suwon Samsung Bluewings. The match kicked off at 16:00 KST. The referee for the match was Choi Myung-Yong.

Road to the final

Busan I'Park

1Busan's goals always recorded first.

Suwon Samsung Bluewings

1Suwon's goals always recorded first.

Match details

See also
2010 Korean FA Cup

References

External links

2010
FA
Korean FA Cup Final 2010
Korean FA Cup Final 2010